Some of the Rivers of Hungary include:

Rivers by length
(> 100 km, only the length in Hungary)

Tisza - 597 km - 62,06% of total length
Danube (Duna) - 417 km – 14,60% of total length
Körös - 217.5 km
triple Körös (Hármas-Körös) - 91.3 km – 100% of total length
double Körös (Kettős-Körös) - 37.3 km – 100% of total length
Crișul Negru (Fekete-Körös) - 20.5 km – 12.20% of total length
Crișul Alb (Fehér-Körös) - 9.8 km – 4.16% of total length
Crișul Repede (Sebes-Körös) - 58.6 km – 28.04% of total length
Rába - 188 km – 66,43% of total length
Zagyva - 179 km – 100% of total length
Hortobágy-Berettyó - 167.3 km – 100% of total length
Drava (Dráva) - 166.8 km – 22,27% of total length
Ipeľ (Ipoly) - 143 km – 61.51% of total length
Zala - 126 km – 100% of total length
Sajó - 125.1 km – 56.10% of total length
Répce and Rábca together - 123.7 km
Sajó - 120.8 km – 100% of total length
Hornád (Hernád) - 118 km – 41.26% of total length
Kapos - 112.7 km – 100% of total length
Tarna - 105 km – 100% of total length
Marcal - 100.4 km – 100% of total length

Rivers by drainage area

(> 1000 km2, only the area in Hungary)

Danube (Duna) - 93,030 km² – 11,7% of total basin
Rába - 
Marcal - 3,033 km² – 100% of total basin
Ipeľ (Ipoly) - 1,518 km² – 29.72% of total basin
Sió - 14,953 km² – 100% of total basin
Kapos - 3,170 km² – 100% of total basin
Drava (Dráva) - 8,215.22 km² – 19% of total basin
Tisza - 46,000 km² – 29,27% of total basin
Sajó - 5,545 km² – 43,63% of total basin
Hornád (Hernád) - 1,136 km² – 20,90% of total basin
Zagyva - 5,677 km² – 100% of total basin
Tarna - 2,116 km² – 100% of total basin
Körös - 12,942.39 km² – 47% of total basin
Balaton from (Zala river and others) – 5,181 km²

Rivers by average discharge

(> 10 m3/s, this list includes not only in Hungary)

Danube (Duna) - 6855 m³/s – in Budapest 2350 m³/s 
Tisza - 820 m³/s
Drava (Dráva) - 670 m³/s
Mureș (Maros) - 184 m³/s
Mur (Mura) - 166 m³/s
Bodrog - 115 m³/s
Someș (Szamos) - 114 m³/s
Körös (Hármas-Körös) - 100 m³/s
Sajó - 60 m³/s
Sió - 39 m³/s
Hornád (Hernád) - 30.9 m³/s
Crișul Repede (Sebes-Körös) - 25.4 m³/s
Rába - 18 m³/s

Rivers by orography
Rivers that flow into other rivers are sorted by the proximity of their points of confluence to the sea (the lower in the list, the more upstream).

Black Sea
The rivers in this section are sorted north-west (Austria) to south (Croatia-Serbia).

Danube/Duna (main branch at Sulina, Romania)
 Mosoni-Duna - branch of Danube
Leitha/Lajta (in Mosonmagyaróvár) R
Rábca (near Győr) R
Rába (in Győr) R
Marcal (near Gyirmót) R
Pinka (near Körmend) L
Lafnitz/Lapincs (near Szentgotthárd) L
Concó (near Ács) R
 Által-ér (in Dunaalmás) R
Ipeľ/Ipoly (near Szob) L
 Kiskunsági main channel (near Tass) L
Sió (in Gemenc Forest) R
Sárvíz (in Sióagárd) L
Séd (in Cece) R
Kapos (near Tolnanémeti) R
Sugovica (in Baja) L
Drava/Dráva (near Osijek, Croatia) R
Mur/Mura (near Legrad, Croatia) L
Big Krka/Kerka (near Muraszemenye) L
Ledava/Ledva (near Muraszemenye) R
Cserta (near Kerkateskánd) L
Lower Válicka/Alsó-Valicka (near Páka) L

Tisza (near Titel, Serbia) L
Túr (near Szatmárcseke) L
Someș/Szamos (near Vásárosnamény) L
Crasna/Kraszna (in Vásárosnamény) L
Bodrog (in Tokaj) R
Roňava/Ronyva (near Sátoraljaújhely) R
 Keleti main channel (near Tiszalök) L
Sajó (near Tiszaújváros) R
Takta (near Kesznyéten) L
Hornád/Hernád (near Sajóhídvég) L
Szinva (in Miskolc) R
Bódva (near Boldva) L
Zagyva (in Szolnok) R
Tarna (near Jászjákóhalma) L
Galga (near Jászfényszaru) R
Hármas-Körös (in Csongrád) L
Hortobágy-Berettyó (near Mezőtúr) R
Crișul Repede/Sebes-Körös (near Körösladány) R
Barcău/Berettyó (near Szeghalom) R
 Kettős-Körös (continuation of Hármas-Körös)
Crișul Negru/Fekete-Körös (near Gyula)
Crișul Alb/Fehér-Körös (near Gyula)
Mureș/Maros (near Szeged) L

Lake Balaton
The rivers in this section are sorted north-west to south-west.
Zala (near Balatonszentgyörgy)
Upper Válicka/Felső-Valicka (near Zalaegerszeg) R

Alphabetical list

Berettyó, Bodrog, Bodva, Dráva/Drava, Hernád, Fehér-Körös, Fekete-Körös, Ipoly, Kígyós/Plazović, Körös, Körös-ér, Kraszna, Lajta/Leitha, Maros, Mura/Mur, Pinka, Rába/Raab, Sajó, Sebes-Körös, Séd, Sió, Sugovica, Szamos, Szinva, Tisza, Zagyva, Zala, Válicka

See also
 Geography of Hungary
 List of lakes of Hungary

Hungary
Rivers